Sidney Michaels (August 17, 1927 – April 22, 2011, aged 83) was an American playwright best known for the early and mid 1960s works Tchin-Tchin, Dylan, and Ben Franklin in Paris.

References

External links

1927 births
2011 deaths
20th-century American dramatists and playwrights